Rhionaeschna psilus, the turquoise-tipped darner, is a species of darner in the family Aeshnidae. It is found in the Caribbean, Central America, North America, and South America.

The IUCN conservation status of Rhionaeschna psilus is "LC", least concern, with no immediate threat to the species' survival. The population is stable.

References

 von Ellenrieder, Natalia (2003). "A synopsis of the neotropical species of 'Aeshna' Fabricius: The genus Rhionaeschna Förster (Odonata: Aeshnidae)". Tijdschrift voor Entomologie, vol. 146, no. 1, 67-207.

Further reading

 Arnett, Ross H. (2000). American Insects: A Handbook of the Insects of America North of Mexico. CRC Press.

Aeshnidae